A referendum on political reforms was held in Andorra on 16 January 1978. Voters were presented with two options, but the none of the above option received the most votes.

Background
In February 1977, the General Council and the Co-Princes agreed to political reforms, putting forward six options to voters in a referendum in October 1977. However, none of the options received a majority of the vote, and 30% of votes cast were left blank.

A second referendum was planned with voters offered a choice between the proposal that received the most votes in the 1977 referendum, and a new proposal. Proposal 6 had received the most votes in the 1977 referendum, and had been put forward by the Democratic Agrupament d'Andorra. They proposed having the General Council elected by proportional representation with regional lists, together with a directly-elected Prime Minister. The Prime Minister would then appoint a deputy and four ministers. The General Council put forward a new Proposal 7, which would increase the number of parishes from 6 to 7. Each parish would elect four members to the General Council, whilst the Prime Minister would be directly elected.

Results

References

1978 referendums
1978 in Andorra
Referendums in Andorra
Constitutional referendums
January 1978 events in Europe
Multiple-choice referendums

it:Referendum in Andorra del 1977-1978